Kenneth Arnold Chesney  (born March 26, 1968) is an American country music singer, songwriter, and guitarist. He has recorded more than 20 albums and has produced more than 40 Top 10 singles on the U.S. Billboard Hot Country Songs and Country Airplay charts, 32 of which have reached number one. Many of these have also charted within the Top 40 of the U.S. Billboard Hot 100, making him one of the most successful crossover country artists. He has sold over 30 million albums worldwide.

Chesney has received twelve Country Music Association Awards (including winning their top Entertainer of the Year honor four times) and eleven Academy of Country Music Awards (including four consecutive Entertainer of the Year awards from 2005 to 2008), as well as six Grammy Award nominations. He is one of the most popular touring acts in country music, regularly selling out the venues in which he performs. His 2007 Flip-Flop Summer Tour was the highest-grossing country road trip of the year.

Early life
Chesney was born on March 26, 1968, in Knoxville, Tennessee, United States, at St. Mary's Medical Center and was raised in Luttrell. He is of English and Irish descent. He is the son of David Chesney, a former elementary school teacher, and Karen Chandler, a hair stylist in the Knoxville area. Chesney has one sibling, a younger sister named Jennifer Chandler. In 1986, Chesney graduated from Gibbs High School, where he played baseball and football. He received his first guitar, "The Terminor", for Christmas and began teaching himself how to play it. 

Chesney studied advertising at East Tennessee State University in Johnson City, where he was a member of the ETSU Bluegrass Program and the Lambda Chi Alpha fraternity and graduated in 1990. In 1989, he recorded a self-released demo album at the Classic Recording Studio in Bristol, Virginia. He sold 1,000 copies while performing at the local clubs in Johnson City and used the money from album sales to help himself buy a new guitar. 

After graduation from East Tennessee State in 1990, he moved to Nashville, Tennessee, where he performed at several local clubs, including The Bluebird Cafe. He became the resident performer at The Turf, a honky tonk bar in the city's historic district.

Career and awards

Signing first publishing and record deals 
In 1992, the head of writer relations at BMI, Clay Bradley, recommended Chesney to his friend, Troy Tomlinson, at Opryland Music Group by saying: "I met this kid today from East Tennessee. He's a good singer, a good songwriter, and more than anything, I think you're going to really like him as a person." Chesney performed five songs during his audition for Tomlinson. Tomlinson's reaction was enthusiastic, later telling HitQuarters:

First of all I was attracted to the songs, because I thought that he painted great pictures in his lyrics, particularly for someone who had not been around the typical Music Row co-writes. I thought that he sang very well too. But more than anything there was a kind of this 'I-will-do-it' look in his eyes – I was really drawn in by the fact that he was so set on being successful in this business.

Chesney left the audition with a songwriter's contract. A year later, an appearance at a songwriter's showcase led to a contract with Capricorn Records, which had recently started a country division.

In My Wildest Dreams (1994) 
Chesney's debut album, In My Wildest Dreams, was released on the independent Capricorn Records label in April 1994. The album's first two singles, "Whatever It Takes" and "The Tin Man", both reached the lower regions of the U.S. Billboard Hot Country Singles & Tracks chart. The album sold approximately 10,000 copies before Capricorn Records closed its country music division in Nashville later that year and moved to Atlanta.

All I Need to Know (1995) 
Chesney then signed with BNA Records, and released his second studio album All I Need to Know in 1995. The album produced three singles. "Fall in Love" and the title track both reached the Top 10, while "Grandpa Told Me So" peaked at number 23. That same year, Chesney co-wrote Confederate Railroad's single "When He Was My Age" from their album When and Where. Chesney utilized fiddle and steel instrumentation within this album in order to highlight the down-home sentiments and the unique Tennessee twang in his voice. This album seemed to capture the traditional spirit that made country music popular.

Me and You (1996–97) 
Chesney's third studio album and his second major-label one, entitled Me and You, was released in 1996. Its first single, "Back In My Arms Again", peaked just outside the Top 40 on the country charts, while its title track (which Chesney had recorded on his previous album) and "When I Close My Eyes" (which was previously recorded by Keith Palmer on his 1991 debut album and then by Larry Stewart on his 1993 debut album Down the Road) both peaked at number 2. Me and You was Chesney's first album to be certified gold by the Recording Industry Association of America (RIAA). A cover of Mac McAnally's 1990 single "Back Where I Come From" was also included on this album. Even though Chesney's version was never released as a single, it has been regularly performed during his concerts. In recognition of his successful year, Chesney was honored with the 1997 Academy of Country Music's New Male Vocalist of the Year award.

I Will Stand (1997–98) 
I Will Stand, Chesney's fourth album and his third from BNA Records, followed in 1997. The album's first single, "She's Got It All", became Chesney's first number one hit on the Billboard country charts and spent three weeks at that position. The album's second single, "A Chance", peaked just shy of the Top 10. The third single, "That's Why I'm Here", peaked at number 2 in 1998.

Everywhere We Go (1999) 
Everywhere We Go, Chesney's fourth album from BNA, came in 1999. That album produced two consecutive number one hits with "How Forever Feels" and "You Had Me from Hello" (the latter inspired by a line in the movie Jerry Maguire). The album also produced two more singles with "She Thinks My Tractor's Sexy" and "What I Need to Do", which peaked at numbers 11 and 8 on the country charts, respectively. Everywhere We Go was Chesney's first album to be certified platinum. The album marked a departure from his original neotraditional country sound, to his more familiar country pop/trop rock/Gulf and Western sound he has since become known for.

Greatest Hits (2000) 
By 2000, Chesney released his Greatest Hits compilation album. It included four new tracks, as well as updated versions of "Fall in Love", "The Tin Man", and "Back Where I Come From". The new version of "The Tin Man" was one of the disc's three singles, along with two of the new tracks, "I Lost It" and "Don't Happen Twice". In 2001 he performed with Kid Rock at a Waylon Jennings tribute concert covering Waylon's song Luckenbach Texas.

No Shoes, No Shirt, No Problems (2002–03) 
The album No Shoes, No Shirt, No Problems was released in 2002. Its lead-off single, "Young", peaked at number 2, while the follower "The Good Stuff" spent seven weeks at number 1 and became Billboards number one country song of the year for 2002. The video for "Young" was honored by CMT with the Video of the Year and Male Video of the Year awards for 2002. In 2003, ACM honored Chesney as Top Male Vocalist of the Year, while "The Good Stuff" received the award for Single Record of the Year. CMT later recognized the video for the album's title track as the Hottest Video of the Year.

All I Want for Christmas Is a Real Good Tan (2003) 
In 2003, Chesney recorded All I Want for Christmas Is a Real Good Tan. The album's title track peaked at No. 30 on the country charts from holiday airplay. Other notable work Chesney did in 2003 is that he co wrote Kid Rock's single "Cold and Empty" from his self-titled 6th studio album Kid Rock.

When the Sun Goes Down (2004–05) 
2004 saw the release of the album When the Sun Goes Down. Its lead-off single, "There Goes My Life", spent seven weeks at number one on the Billboard country charts. On April 21, 2004, the accompanying music video for that song was honored by CMT with the Male Video of the Year award. The album's title track, a duet with Uncle Kracker, also went to number one. The music video for the album's third single, "I Go Back", was honored on April 11, 2005, with Country Music Television's Male Video of the Year Award. This song, along with the album's fourth single, "The Woman with You", both peaked at number two. The fifth single, "Anything But Mine", reached number one, and the final single, "Keg in the Closet", peaked to number six.

When the Sun Goes Down was honored with the 2004 CMA award for Album of the Year while Chesney was honored as the Entertainer of the Year. He was also presented with AMA's 2004 Artist of the Year award.

Be as You Are and The Road and the Radio (2005–06) 
In January 2005, Chesney released the album Be as You Are (Songs from an Old Blue Chair), supporting it with his Somewhere in the Sun Tour. Be as You Are is composed mostly of ballads. The album qualified for RIAA Platinum  and entered the top of both mainstream country and pop music.

In spring 2005, Chesney was honored with the prestigious Triple-Crown Award presented by the Academy of Country Music. This award was presented after Chesney's 2004 Academy of Country Music's Entertainer of the Year award was combined with 1997's New Male Vocalist of the Year award and 2003's Top Male Vocalist of the Year award. The following year, on May 23, 2006, Chesney was honored with his second Entertainer of the Year at the Academy of Country Music Awards.

Chesney's next album, The Road and the Radio, debuted at number one the Billboard 200 and produced five singles. "Living in Fast Forward", "Summertime", and "Beer in Mexico" all reached number one, while "Who You'd Be Today" and "You Save Me" both broke the Top 5. Chesney promotes his beliefs of perfection, as getting songs right in the studio, ultimately leads to performing it right on the road and on the radio.

Live: Live Those Songs Again (2006) 
Live: Live Those Songs Again, Chesney's first live album was released on September 19, 2006, via BNA Records. This album includes live renditions of 15 songs, 11 of which were singles. "Live Those Songs", "Never Gonna Feel Like That Again", "On the Coast of Somewhere Beautiful", and "Back Where I Come From" were never released by Chesney as singles, although "Back Where I Come From" was released as a single from Mac McAnally's 1990 album Simple Life.

Collaborations 
Chesney collaborated with one of his personal heroes, Jimmy Buffett, on a remake of Hank Williams' single "Hey Good Lookin' (with Clint Black, Alan Jackson, Toby Keith, and George Strait), and a second song "License To Chill". Both songs are on Buffett's 2004 album License To Chill.

Chesney, along with Tim McGraw, contributed to a version of Tracy Lawrence's single "Find Out Who Your Friends Are", which can be found on his album For the Love. The official single version, only featuring Lawrence's vocals, was released in August 2006 but did not reach the Top 40 on the country charts until January 2007, when 'the album was released. After the album's release, the version with him, Chesney, and McGraw began receiving significant airplay, helping to boost the single to No. 1 on the country charts. The song became Lawrence's first No. 1 single in 11 years, as well as the second-slowest climbing No. 1 single in the history of the Billboard music charts.

With Neil Thrasher and Wendell Mobley, Chesney also co-wrote Rascal Flatts' 2007 single Take Me There", which served as the lead-off single to their album Still Feels Good.

Chesney also recorded a duet with Reba McEntire on her No. 1 2007 album Reba: Duets. "Every Other Weekend" peaked at No. 15 on the Billboard Hot Country Songs chart and No. 104 on the Billboard Bubbling Under Hot 100 Singles chart. The album has sold 2.1 million copies world-wide and is certified Platinum by the RIAA for sales of over 1 million. "Every Other Weekend" was the final single from the album.

Super Hits (2007) 
On November 7, 2007, Chesney was named the CMA Entertainer of the Year for the third time in four years. The following week, on November 15, 2007, the compilation Super Hits album was released as part of Sony BMG's Super Hits series.

Just Who I Am: Poets & Pirates (2007–2008) 

On September 11, 2007, Chesney released the album Just Who I Am: Poets & Pirates. This album represented a move to a more gulf and western sound with a number of "breezy, steel-drum island songs". Kanye West and 50 Cent's albums Graduation and Curtis were both released that same day. Those artists were in the midst of a competitive sales war, with the latter claiming that he would end his solo rap career if West sold more albums than he did (remarks he later retracted as terms of his contract conflicted with the promise). Chesney, however, decided that he would give country music a place in the competition, claiming country artists were just as popular as those in the rap genre. Chesney came in third place in record sales among the three musical artists.

The lead-off single from Just Who I Am: Poets & Pirates was "Never Wanted Nothing More". That song became Chesney's twelfth number one hit on the Billboard country charts.  On the U.S. Billboard Hot Country Songs chart dated for the week ending on September 15, 2007, the album's second single "Don't Blink" debuted at No. 16, setting a new record for the highest debut on that chart since the inception of SoundScan electronic tabulation in 1990. This record was broken one week later by Garth Brooks' "More Than a Memory", which debuted at No. 1 on the same chart, making it the first song ever to do so. The third single, "Shiftwork" (a duet with George Strait) peaked at No. 2 on the country charts. During the week of June 28, 2008, the fourth and final single, "Better as a Memory", became Chesney's fourteenth number one hit.

Chesney started his Poets and Pirates Tour on April 26, 2008, at Williams-Brice Stadium in Columbia, South Carolina. During the introduction of his set, his boot got caught between a hydraulic lift and the lip of the stage surface, which crushed his foot causing a severe hematoma in the ankle; most of the damage was centering within his toes. It took about 30 seconds for Chesney to pry his foot loose as he squatted down on the stage while the band continued to play an extended introduction of the song. When Chesney finally freed himself, he stood up and held his hand on his knee as he began singing.

Chesney did not acknowledge the injury during the early part of his performance. However, he was visibly limping and seemed to rest near a drum riser while leaning over and holding his knee during the instrumental breaks of his songs. As he came offstage, a doctor from the University of South Carolina cut off Chesney's cowboy boot and immediately began treating the foot injury. X-rays that were taken afterwards revealed several crushed bones in his right foot.

That injury did not have him cancel any shows, as saying "[the doctor] told me it's going to hurt – though nothing could hurt worse than Saturday, I don't think – and they can give me something to deaden the pain when I get out there. I also have to have a doctor standing by should something give, but I'm going to tape it up, and I'm going to get out there".

On May 19, 2008, just a day after being honored as the ACM Entertainer of the Year at the 43rd Annual Academy of Country Music Awards, Chesney criticized the lack of choice in the producers' awarding the honor based on fan votes. "The entertainer of the year trophy is supposed to represent heart and passion and an amazing amount of sacrifice, commitment and focus", he said. "That's the way Garth [Brooks] won it four times, that's the way I won it, that's the way [George] Strait won it, Reba [McEntire], Alabama all those years. That's what it's supposed to represent."

Lucky Old Sun (2008–2009) 

On July 24, 2008, Chesney announced that he would be releasing a new single from an upcoming album entitled Lucky Old Sun. The song was titled "Everybody Wants to Go to Heaven", and for the chart week of August 16, 2008, it debuted at No. 22 on the Billboard Hot Country Songs chart. The album was released on October 14, 2008. "Everybody Wants to Go to Heaven" became a No. 1 hit. It was followed by a cover of Mac McAnally's 1990 single "Down the Road".

Chesney's 2009 tour was titled the Sun City Carnival Tour and featured both small and large venues in order to keep his ticket prices down. The tour included a performance at Gillette Stadium again, marking the fifth year in a row that he played at the Foxboro, Massachusetts football field.

In this same period, Chesney produced a film for ESPN titled The Boys of Fall (2010).

Greatest Hits II (2010) 
In May 2009, Chesney released his second compilation album, Greatest Hits II. This album included the No. 1 hit, "Out Last Night", as the lead single. On February 9, 2010, this album was re-released with two new tracks "This Is Our Moment" and "Ain't Back Yet", with the latter becoming the album's third single in February 2010. Also included on this album is one that Willie Nelson recorded before Chesney did, "I'm Alive". Chesney himself later recorded a version of the song as a duet with Dave Matthews. This version was released in August 2009 as the album's second single.

Hemingway's Whiskey (2010–2011) 
In July 2010, Chesney released "The Boys of Fall" as the lead-off single from his album Hemingway's Whiskey, which was released in September 2010. The song hit No. 1 on the Hot Country Songs chart for the week of October 9, 2010, marking Chesney's eighteenth number one hit.

He then appeared at the 44th Annual Country Music Awards on November 10, 2010.

The second single from Hemingway's Whiskey, "Somewhere with You", was released in November 2010. The song debuted at No. 35 on the country chart for the week of November 6, 2010. Both it and its followup, "Live a Little", went to number 1 on the country charts. The next single was "You and Tequila", co-written and originally recorded by Deana Carter. Chesney's rendition, which featured Grace Potter on backing vocals, went to number 3. After it, "Reality" also went to number 1.

Chesney produced and narrated a biographical film, The Color Orange, on his favorite football player growing up, University of Tennessee quarterback and Canadian Football League hall-of-fame Condredge Holloway. The film was produced for ESPN's "Year of the Quarterback" series, and premiered on February 20, 2011.

Welcome to the Fishbowl (2012) 
Chesney released his fourteenth studio album, Welcome to the Fishbowl, on June 19, 2012. Its lead-off single, a Tim McGraw duet titled "Feel Like a Rock Star", debuted at number 13 on the country charts, making it the second-highest debuting country song since the Billboard charts were first tabulated via Nielsen SoundScan, and the highest-debuting duet on that chart. Despite its high debut, the song peaked at number 11 only six weeks later before falling.

BNA Records closed in June 2012. As a result, Chesney was transferred to Columbia Nashville. His first release under Columbia was the album's second single, "Come Over", which went to number 1. The album's third and final single was "El Cerrito Place", which was written by Keith Gattis and originally recorded by Charlie Robison. Chesney's rendition, which featured Grace Potter on backing vocals, went to number 10 on the country charts.

Life on a Rock (2013) 
Chesney released his fifteenth studio album, Life on a Rock, on April 30, 2013. The first single from the album, "Pirate Flag", was released to iTunes on February 5, 2013, and peaked at number 3 on the Country Airplay chart in May 2013. Pirate Flag peaked at number 7 on Billboard's Hot Country Songs chart, May 25, 2013. The album's second single, "When I See This Bar", was released to country radio on June 10, 2013. When I see This Bar peaked at number 25 on Billboard's Hot Country Songs chart, September 14, 2013. This specific album was a drastic change from his regular country feel, to an all beach and island touch.

The Big Revival (2014) 
In June 2014, Chesney released the new song "American Kids" to radio. This song served as the lead-off single from his sixteenth studio album The Big Revival, which was released on September 23, 2014. The album's second single, "Til It's Gone", was released in mid-October. It reached number one on the Country Airplay chart the week of January 31, 2015. The third single "Wild Child", which is a duet with Grace Potter, was released two days later. It reached number one on the Country Airplay chart the week of June 27, 2015. The album's fourth single, "Save It for a Rainy Day", was released to country radio on June 29, 2015. It reached number one on the Country Airplay chart the week of October 9, 2015.

On October 24, Chesney announced his 2015 tour The Big Revival Tour, which began on March 26, 2015. On October 27, he and Jason Aldean announced that they would perform 10 joint stadium shows in the summer of that year. Two days later, Brantley Gilbert announced that he would be opening for the Chesney/Aldean stadium shows, as well as five additional shows on Chesney's solo tour.

Cosmic Hallelujah (2016) 
On March 7, 2016, Chesney announced that he was in the studio working on new music. The lead single to the album is titled "Noise", which was released to country radio on March 24, 2016. The album, Cosmic Hallelujah, was released on October 28. The second song in the album, "Setting the World on Fire", featuring singer P!NK was released to country radio on July 28, 2016.

No Shoes Nation (2017) 
On August 25, 2012, at Gillette Stadium in Foxborough, Massachusetts, Kenny Chesney announced to his fans that he would call his fan following No Shoes Nation. The term No Shoes Nation originated from Chesney's hit song "No Shoes, No Shirt, No Problem". The symbol of No Shoes Nation is a black flag with a white skull and crossbones. The name was accompanied by a live album called Live in No Shoes Nation, which topped the Billboard 200 after its release in late 2017. No Shoes Nation inspired the name of Chesney's Sirius XM channel, No Shoes Radio.

Songs for the Saints (2018) 
In January 2018, it was announced that Chesney had ended his contract with Sony Music Nashville and signed to Warner Bros. Records Nashville. Chesney released his first album with Warner, entitled Songs for the Saints, on July 27, 2018.

Here and Now (2020) 
In March 2020, he announced a new album called Here and Now, which features the title track and "Tip of My Tongue", a leadoff single that was released in mid-2019. The album debuted at number one and became Chesney's 16th top 10 album on the U.S. Billboard 200, with 233,000 units.

Personal life 
In 2000, Chesney and Tim McGraw became involved in a scuffle with police officers in Buffalo, New York, after Chesney attempted to ride a police horse. McGraw came to Chesney's aid after police officers nearby believed the horse was being stolen. The two were arrested and charged, Chesney for disorderly conduct and McGraw for assault, but were acquitted in 2001.

On May 9, 2005, Chesney married actress Renée Zellweger in a ceremony on the island of St. John. They had met in January at a tsunami relief event. On September 15 of that same year, after only four months of marriage, they announced their plans for an annulment. Zellweger cited fraud as the reason in the related papers, and after media scrutiny of her use of the word "fraud," she qualified the use of the term, stating that it was "simply legal language and not a reflection of Kenny's character." Chesney later suggested the failure of his marriage was due to "the fact that I panicked." In an interview by 60 Minutes with Anderson Cooper, Chesney commented on the failed marriage, "The only fraud that was committed was me thinking that I knew what it was like… that I really understood what it was like to be married, and I really didn't." The annulment was finalized in late December 2005.

In 2015, Forbes estimated Chesney's annual income at $42 million.

Philanthropy 
In 2017, Chesney came to the aid of the U.S. and British Virgin Islands victims of Hurricane Irma, one of whom was given a free lift to the mainland United States. Chesney owns a mansion on St. John in the U.S. Virgin Islands, where many stayed to weather the storm. Chesney also set up a charitable fund, Love for Love City, to help victims of the storm. Chesney will donate all proceeds from "Songs for the Saints" to the fund.

Tours 
Chesney won the Billboard Touring Award for Top Package Tour five consecutive years between 2005 and 2009, and again in 2011
Headlining
1998: I Will Stand Tour
1999: Everywhere We Go Tour
2000-01: Kenny Chesney on Tour
2002: No Shoes, No Shirt, No Problems Tour
2003: Margaritas 'n Senoritas Tour
2004: Guitars, Tiki Bars and a Whole Lotta Love Tour
2005: Somewhere in the Sun Tour
2006: The Road and The Radio Tour
2007: Flip-Flop Summer Tour
2008: Poets and Pirates Tour
2009: Sun City Carnival Tour
2013: No Shoes Nation Tour
2015: The Big Revival Tour
2016: Spread the Love Tour
2018: Trip Around the Sun Tour
2019: Songs for the Saints Tour
2022: Here and Now Tour
2023: I Go Back Tour
Co-headlining
2011: Goin' Coastal Tour 
2012: Brothers of the Sun Tour 

Opening act
1998, 1999, 2000: George Strait Country Music Festival

Discography

Studio albums
In My Wildest Dreams (1994)
All I Need to Know (1995)
Me and You (1996)
I Will Stand (1997)
Everywhere We Go (1999)
No Shoes, No Shirt, No Problems (2002)
All I Want for Christmas Is a Real Good Tan (2003)
When the Sun Goes Down (2004)
Be as You Are (Songs from an Old Blue Chair) (2005)
The Road and the Radio (2005)
Just Who I Am: Poets & Pirates (2007)
Lucky Old Sun (2008)
Hemingway's Whiskey (2010)
Welcome to the Fishbowl (2012)
Life on a Rock (2013)
The Big Revival (2014)
Cosmic Hallelujah (2016)
Songs for the Saints (2018)
Here and Now (2020)

See also 
 List of best-selling music artists
 List of highest-grossing live music artists

References

External links

 Official website
 Kenny Chesney's No Shoes Radio
 Official Film Website for Kenny Chesney: Summer in 3D
 http://www.kennychesneymovie.com/

 
1968 births
Living people
American country singer-songwriters
American male singer-songwriters
American people of English descent
American people of Irish descent
BNA Records artists
Columbia Records artists
Country musicians from Tennessee
East Tennessee State University alumni
Gulf and Western musicians
Music of East Tennessee
Musicians from Knoxville, Tennessee
People from Union County, Tennessee
Capricorn Records artists
Singer-songwriters from Tennessee